Kinsey is an unincorporated community in Custer County, Montana, United States. The community has a post office with ZIP code 59338.

The town name came from Jack Kinsey, who opened a post office in 1898.

References

Unincorporated communities in Custer County, Montana
Unincorporated communities in Montana